Space Doctor is a novel by Lee Correy published in 1981.

Plot summary
Space Doctor is a novel in which Dr. Tom Noels works as a medic as part of the construction of the first solar power satellite in space.

Reception
Greg Costikyan reviewed Space Doctor in Ares Magazine #10 and commented that "Space Doctor drags a bit, and the love interest uses one of the oldest tricks around, but on the whole it is an interesting novel, well worth reading – especially for those interested in near-future exploration of space."

Reviews
 Review by Gene DeWeese (1981) in Science Fiction Review, Winter 1981

References

1981 novels